Léopold Dries (27 September 1901 – 12 August 1960) was a Belgian footballer. He played in three matches for the Belgium national football team from 1924 to 1925.

References

External links
 

1901 births
1960 deaths
Belgian footballers
Belgium international footballers
Association football midfielders
People from Herentals
Footballers from Antwerp Province